Nils-Olof Franzén (1916–1997) was a Swedish writer who wrote the Agaton Sax series. He was born 23 August 1916, in Oxelösund. He died on 24 February 1997, at age 81. Franzén was married and had three children. His literary estate is represented by ALIS.

He was director of programmes for Swedish Radio from 1956 to 1973, and also wrote a number of biographies.

The first of his Agaton Sax books, Agaton Sax klipper till, was published in 1955. According to a description inside Agaton Sax and the Criminal Doubles, Franzén originally wrote the stories for his son.

The books
Source:

References

1916 births
1997 deaths
People from Oxelösund Municipality
Writers from Södermanland
Swedish crime fiction writers